The Satin Girl is a 1923 American silent drama film directed by Arthur Rosson and starring Mabel Forrest, Norman Kerry and Marc McDermott. The main themes of the film are amnesia and brainwashing. Lenore Vance, the main character, loses her memory due to shock. A wicked uncle reprograms her into a robber.

Plot 
The story revolves around a young woman named Lenore Vance (Mabel Forrest), who loses her memory after witnessing the death of her father Silas Gregg (William H Turner). She commits a series of robberies due to being brainwashed by her elderly, reclusive, chemist uncle named Fargo (Marc Mac Dermott).  She later becomes the person of interest in the murder of her father, being labelled by the authorities as "The Satin Girl". A physician named Dr. Richard Taunton (Norman Kerry) meets Lenore at a party thrown by Millie Brown-Potter (Kate Lester), and becomes infatuated with her. After discovering that Lenore has taken pieces of jewelry from himself and Mrs. Potter, he uses a piece of evidence left behind to investigate the crimes himself, and makes the discovery that Fargo is the one who killed Silas. The police are notified, but they discover that he has committed suicide upon arriving at his house. It is later revealed to the audience that the entire story is in a book that Lenore is reading.

Cast
 Mabel Forrest as Lenore Vance
 Norman Kerry as Dr. Richard Taunton
 Marc McDermott as Fargo Gregg
 Clarence Burton as Moran
 Florence Lawrence as Sylvia
 Kate Lester as Millie Brown-Potter
 Reed House as Norton Pless
 William H. Turner as Silas Gregg
Walter Stephens as Harg

Reception 
The film received high praise for its casting upon release. C.S Sewell of The Moving Picture World writes: "Norman Kerry is well cast as the young physician and Marc McDermott is effective as the master-criminal. Mabel Forrest does good work as the girl. The remainder of the cast is satisfactory." One reviewer from Variety says: "Mabel Forrest can act, and does so with skill and intelligence. Then there's Marc McDermott, a character actor who classes with the very best of the screen's handful of the good ones. Norman Kerry gives a dignified portrayal of the M.D., and the contributory parts are unusually well played."

References

Bibliography
 Connelly, Robert B. The Silents: Silent Feature Films, 1910-36, Volume 40, Issue 2. December Press, 1998.

External links
 

1923 films
1923 drama films
1920s English-language films
American silent feature films
Silent American drama films
American black-and-white films
Films directed by Arthur Rosson
Films with screenplays by George H. Plympton
Films about amnesia
Films about mind control
1920s American films
English-language drama films